Cecidocharini is a tribe of tephritid  or fruit flies in the family Tephritidae.

Genera
Cecidocharella Hendel, 1936
Cecidochares Bezzi, 1910
Hetschkomyia Hendel, 1914
Neorhagoletis Hendel, 1914
Ostracocoelia Giglio-Tos, 1893
Procecidochares Hendel, 1914
Procecidocharoides Foote, 1960
Pyrgotoides Curran, 1934

References

Tephritinae
Diptera tribes